Mbaka River is a river of Mbeya Region, Tanzania. It originates on the south slopes of Mount Rungwe and flows southeast into the north end of Lake Malawi at Mwaya.

References

Rivers of Tanzania
Geography of Mbeya Region